The 1975 Boston University Terriers football team was an American football team that represented Boston University as a member of the Yankee Conference during the 1975 NCAA Division II football season. In their third season under head coach Paul Kemp, the Terriers compiled a 5–6 record (1–4 against conference opponents), tied for last place in the conference, and were outscored by a total of 220 to 142.

Boston University played its home games on Nickerson Field, which was part of the Case Sports Complex and was formerly known as Braves Field, the home of the Boston Braves.

Schedule

References

Boston University
Boston University Terriers football seasons
Boston University Terriers football